Lawrence Donald Casey (born June 17, 1937) is an American former professional and collegiate basketball coach.  He has coached two National Basketball Association (NBA) teams, the Los Angeles Clippers and the New Jersey Nets—each for a season and a half.  He had previously coached the Temple Owls from 1973 to 1982. He also worked as an assistant coach with the Chicago Bulls (1982–83) and Boston Celtics (1990–1996).

Casey grew up in Collingswood, New Jersey and attended Camden Catholic High School. As a young man in the 1960s, Casey coached at Bishop Eustace Preparatory School in Pennsauken Township, New Jersey, where he was recommended for a job as a JV coach by a friend and took over the varsity squad after the coach left the job. His coaching led to two state championships. Casey coached Bill Melchionni, a high school and college great who eventually played in the pros in the late 1960s with the ABA New York Nets and Philadelphia 76ers.

In his first season as Temple head coach, Don Casey had his team stall with the basketball in the finals of the Volunteer Classic against Tennessee. The final score of the game was Tennessee 11, Temple 6, the lowest scoring major college basketball game since 1938.

Casey was promoted from assistant to head coach of the Los Angeles Clippers on January 19, 1989, succeeding Gene Shue after a 10–28 start to the 1988–89 season and in the midst of an eleven-game losing streak.

Head coaching record

College

NBA

|-
| style="text-align:left;"|L.A. Clippers
| style="text-align:left;"|
|44||11||33|||| align="center"|7th in Pacific|||—||—||—||—
| style="text-align:center;"|—
|- class="sortbottom"
|-
| style="text-align:left;"|L.A. Clippers
| style="text-align:left;"|

|82||30||52|||| align="center"|6th in Pacific|||—||—||—||—
| style="text-align:center;"|—
|- class="sortbottom"
|-
| style="text-align:left;"|New Jersey
| style="text-align:left;"|
|30||13||17|||| align="center"|7th in Atlantic|||—||—||—||—
| style="text-align:center;"|—
|- class="sortbottom"
|-
| style="text-align:left;"|New Jersey
| style="text-align:left;"|

|82||31||51|||| align="center"|6th in Atlantic|||—||—||—||—
| style="text-align:center;"|—
|- class="sortbottom"
| style="text-align:left;"|Career
| ||238||85||153|||| ||—||—||—||—||

References

External links
 BasketballReference.com: Don Casey

1937 births
Living people
American expatriate basketball people in Italy
American men's basketball coaches
Basketball coaches from New Jersey
Boston Celtics assistant coaches
Camden Catholic High School alumni
Chicago Bulls assistant coaches
High school basketball coaches in New Jersey
Los Angeles Clippers head coaches
New Jersey Nets head coaches
People from Collingswood, New Jersey
Sportspeople from Camden County, New Jersey
Temple Owls men's basketball coaches
Victoria Libertas Pesaro coaches